The NCAA Division I Football Championship is an annual post-season college football game, played since 2006, used to determine a national champion of the NCAA Division I Football Championship Subdivision (FCS). From 1978 to 2005, the game was known as the NCAA Division I-AA Football Championship.

The game serves as the final match of an annual postseason bracket tournament between top teams in FCS. Since 2013, 24 teams normally participate in the tournament, with some teams receiving automatic bids upon winning their conference championship, and other teams determined by a selection committee. The reigning national champions are the South Dakota State Jackrabbits, who won the championship game for the 2022 season, their first title.

The FCS is the highest division in college football to hold a playoff tournament sanctioned by the NCAA to determine its champion, as the four-team College Football Playoff currently used by the Football Bowl Subdivision (FBS) is not NCAA-sanctioned.

History

Playoff format
In the inaugural season of Division I-AA, the 1978 postseason included just four teams; three regional champions (East, West, and South) plus an at-large selection. The field doubled to eight teams in 1981, with champions of five conferences—Big Sky, Mid-Eastern, Ohio Valley, Southwestern, and Yankee—receiving automatic bids. The top four teams were seeded, and then matched against the four remaining teams based on geographical proximity. The tournament was expanded to 12 teams in 1982, with each of the top four seeds receiving a first-round bye and a home game in the quarterfinals. Champions of the Southern and Southland conferences also received automatic bids.

The number of automatic bids has varied over time, due to changes in the number and size of conferences, with an automatic bid typically granted only to champions of conferences with at least six teams. Initially, the tournament was played in December; since the expansion to twelve teams in 1982, earlier rounds have been held in late November.

The playoffs expanded to a 16-team format in 1986, requiring four postseason victories to win the title. Initially, only the top four teams were seeded, with other teams geographically placed in the bracket. From 1995 through 2000, all 16 teams were seeded, independent of geography. In 2001, the number of seeded teams was reduced to four, with the seeded teams assured of home games in early tournament rounds, and other teams once again placed in the bracket to minimize travel. Home team designation in games between unseeded teams is determined based on several factors, including attendance history and revenue potential.

In April 2008, the NCAA announced that the playoff field would expand to 20 teams in 2010, with the Big South and Northeast Conference earning automatic bids for the first time. That bracket structure included seeding of the top five teams. Twelve teams received first-round byes; the remaining eight teams played first-round games, with the four winners advancing to face the top four seeds. The playoffs expanded to 24 teams beginning in 2013, with the champion of the Pioneer Football League receiving an automatic bid for the first time. The number of seeded teams was increased to eight, with the 16 unseeded teams playing in first-round games. The unseeded teams continue to be paired according to geographic proximity and then placed in the bracket according to geographic proximity to the top eight seeds. Teams cannot travel more than 400 miles via ground, and teams from the same conference that played each other during the regular season are not be paired for first-round games. For the 2020 season, affected by the COVID-19 pandemic in the United States, the bracket was reduced to 16 teams. The bracket returned to 24 teams for the 2021 season.

The field is traditionally set the Sunday before Thanksgiving and play begins that weekend.

Team selection
At-large selections and seeding within the bracket are determined by the FCS Playoff Selection Committee, which consists of one athletic director from each conference with an automatic bid. As of the 2018 season, there were 10 conferences with automatic bids and the selection committee made 14 at-large selections. An 11th automatic bid was added as of the 2021 season, reducing the number of at-large selections to 13.

Championship final

The tournament culminates with the national final, played between the two remaining teams from the playoff bracket. Unlike earlier round games in each year's playoff, which are played at campus sites, the title game is played at a site predetermined by the NCAA, akin to how the NFL predetermines the site for each Super Bowl. Originally played in December, with the 2010 expansion to a 20-team field, the final moved to January, with two or three weeks between the semifinals and final.

The inaugural title game was played in 1978 in Wichita Falls, Texas. The 1979 and 1980 games were held in Orlando, Florida, and Sacramento, California, respectively, and the game returned to Wichita Falls for 1981 and 1982. The games played in Wichita Falls were known as the Pioneer Bowl, while the game played in Sacramento was known as the Camellia Bowl—both names were used for various NCAA playoff games played in those locations, and were not specific to the I-AA championship. In 1983 and 1984, the game was played in Charleston, South Carolina. In 1985 and 1986, Tacoma, Washington, hosted the game, which the NCAA branded as the "Diamond Bowl".

The 1987 and 1988 games were played in Pocatello, Idaho; and from 1989 through 1991, in Statesboro, Georgia. The 1992 through 1996 games were held in Huntington, West Virginia; and from 1997 through 2009, the title game was played in Chattanooga, Tennessee.

Since 2010, the title game has been played in Frisco, Texas, a suburb north of Dallas, at Toyota Stadium, a multi-purpose stadium primarily used by FC Dallas of Major League Soccer. The stadium was known as Pizza Hut Park until the day after the final of the 2011 season, and then as FC Dallas Stadium until September 2013. The original contract with Frisco began in the 2010 season and ran through the 2012 season. The contract has since been extended three times; first through the 2015 season, then through the 2019 season, and most recently through the 2024 season with an option for the 2025 season.

 at the time games were played

 earlier name of the same venue

There have been six instances where a team whose venue was predetermined to host the final game advanced to play for the championship on their own field. Georgia Southern won both title games they played at Paulson Stadium, while Marshall had a 2–2 record in four title games they played at Marshall University Stadium (now known as Joan C. Edwards Stadium).

Non-participants
Three FCS conferences usually do not participate in the tournament: the Ivy League, Mid-Eastern Athletic Conference (MEAC), and Southwestern Athletic Conference (SWAC).

The Ivy League has been at the FCS level since 1982 and prohibits its members from awarding athletic scholarships in any sport, plays a strict ten-game regular season and does not participate in any postseason football, citing academic concerns. The MEAC and SWAC, two conferences consisting of historically black colleges and universities, opt to play the Celebration Bowl (which was established in 2015) instead of the FCS tournament. MEAC gave up its automatic spot in the tournament prior to the 2015 season, while the SWAC's regular season extends through the Turkey Day Classic and Bayou Classic at the end of November and the SWAC Championship Game is played in December. Teams from the MEAC and SWAC may accept at-large bids, so long as they aren't committed to other postseason games that would conflict with the tournament. The most recent MEAC and SWAC teams to accept bids were the 2016 North Carolina A&T Aggies and 2021 Florida A&M Rattlers, respectively.

Historically, conferences in FCS that did not offer athletic scholarships were not granted automatic bids into the tournament and, although in theory were eligible for at-large bids, never received any. The last non-scholarship conference in the subdivision, the Pioneer Football League, now receives a tournament bid, which was initiated with the 2013 postseason.

FCS conferences

Notes

Champions

Championship game history
For each season since the inaugural year of Division I-AA play, 1978, the following table lists the date of each title game and the champion. The score and runner-up are also noted, along with the host city, game attendance, and head coach of the championship team.

Notes:
 1987 champion Northeast Louisiana has been known as the University of Louisiana at Monroe (Louisiana–Monroe) since 1999.
 The 2020–21 school year was the first in which Sam Houston State University called its athletic program "Sam Houston", without the word "State".
 Attendance at the 2020 championship game (played in May 2021) was limited due to the COVID-19 pandemic.

MVPs

Since 2009, a Most Outstanding Player has been named for each final.

Note: starting with the 2010 season, the final game is played in the next calendar year.

Most appearances
The following table summarizes appearances in the final, by team, since the 1978 season, the first year of Division I-AA (the predecessor of FCS).

Updated through the January 2023 playing (45 finals, 90 total appearances). Schools are listed by their current athletic brand names, which do not always match those used in a given season.

* Denotes finals played in the following calendar year.
^ Team is now a member of the Football Bowl Subdivision (FBS).

Appearances by conference
The following table summarizes appearances in the final, by conference, since the 1978 season, the first year of Division I-AA (the predecessor of FCS).

Updated through the January 2023 playing (45 finals, 90 total appearances).

 Games marked with an asterisk (*) were played in the following calendar year.
 Records reflect conference affiliations at the time each game was played.
 Conferences in italics are defunct or not currently active in FCS.
 The Missouri Valley Conference (MVC) and Missouri Valley Football Conference (MVFC) are historically related but independently operating entities. MVFC was known as the Gateway Football Conference until June 2008.
 The Yankee Conference, Atlantic 10 Conference (A-10), and Colonial Athletic Association (CAA), although separately chartered, are effectively the same entity in football. The Yankee Conference, formerly an all-sports conference but a football-only league since 1976, was effectively merged into the A-10 after the 1996 season. In turn, the A-10 shut down its football league after the 2006 season, with the CAA taking over administration of that league as the technically separate entity of CAA Football.  
 Teams from the same conference have met in the championship game following the 2014 and 2022 seasons. Both matchups involved MVFC teams.

Game records
This table lists records for the Championship Game.

Media coverage
The game has been televised on an ESPN affiliated network since 1995.

Note: starting with the 2010 season, the final game is played in the next calendar year.

See also 
 List of NCAA Division I FCS football programs
 List of NCAA Division I FCS playoff appearances by team
 College Football Playoff (FBS)
 NCAA Division II Football Championship
 NCAA Division III Football Championship
 NAIA Football Championship

References

External links